Dochgarroch is a settlement that lies at the start of the Caledonian Canal,  at the head of Loch Ness in Inverness-shire, Scottish Highlands and is in the Scottish council area of Highland.

References

Populated places in Inverness committee area
Loch Ness